The 1984 United States presidential election in Minnesota took place on November 6, 1984 as part of the 1984 United States presidential election. Voters chose ten representatives, or electors to the Electoral College, who voted for president and vice president.

Minnesota voted for the Democratic Party candidate, former Vice President Walter Mondale. He narrowly won his home state over incumbent President Ronald Reagan by just 3,761 votes, giving him his only state victory in the election (Mondale also carried the District of Columbia), resulting in the state weighing in at around 18 percentage points more Democratic than the nation at large. Minnesota was the only state not to back Reagan in either of his two presidential campaigns. Although Mondale won only twenty of the state's 87 counties – making Reagan the only presidential nominee to win a majority of counties in every state – his large majorities in the heavily unionized Iron Range of the northeast overbalanced Reagan's majorities in the more Republican west of the state.

Since the Republican Reagan won all 49 other states in 1984, this established Minnesota's status as the state with the longest streak of voting Democratic. , it still has not voted for a Republican presidential candidate since Richard Nixon carried it when he was re-elected in 1972. However, the District of Columbia has voted Democratic in all presidential elections since 1964, when it was first granted the right to vote in presidential elections. As of 2020, only five of the 20 counties Mondale won in 1984 were won by either Hillary Clinton in 2016 or Joe Biden in 2020. Some examples of counties that have been lost to the Republican Party include those after 1996 (Anoka County), after 2008 (Aitkin County), or after 2012 (Itasca County). Minnesota regenerated as a left-leaning force in the 1990s, late 2000s and early 2010s, but has become a Democratic-leaning swing state in the 21st century, ironically with many former Mondale counties voting Republican in the 21st century.

Despite Mondale carrying his home state, Republican Senator Rudy Boschwitz was re-elected the same night.

When Reagan was asked in December 1984 what he wanted for Christmas, he joked, "Well, Minnesota would have been nice". This marked the first time that a Republican won two terms without ever winning the state at least once.

Results

Results by county

See also
 United States presidential elections in Minnesota
 1972 United States presidential election in Massachusetts, the only state to vote Democratic in 1972, like Minnesota was in 1984.

References

1984
Min
1984 Minnesota elections